Kuppa Ghat (which signifies a "large number of tunnels") is a place located on the banks of the holy river Ganges at Bhagalpur, Bihar, India. According to legends and mythology the great maharishi spent nearly ten years in the caves. The beautiful garden located near the bank of the ganga is known for its reference in the Ramayana.

References

Sources

 
 

Tourist attractions in Bihar